The Sikorsky S-12 was a Russian single engine trainer aircraft completed in the spring of 1913 by the Russian Baltic Railroad Car Works while Igor Sikorsky was the chief engineer of the aircraft manufacturing division.

Design and development
It was smaller and lighter than the S-11 on which it was based, and was specifically designed to be highly maneuverable.

Operational history
The S-12 was the most successful monoplane Sikorsky designed during his time in Russia and twelve examples were produced. 
In September 1913 an S-12 became the first Russian aircraft to perform an inside loop at the Kolomyazhskiy hippodrome north of St. Petersburg. During World War I and the Russian Revolution S-12s served with the Russian Air Force and some were still in service until 1922.

Specifications

References

S-11
Single-engined tractor aircraft
Mid-wing aircraft
Aircraft first flown in 1913
Rotary-engined aircraft